is an airport in Kitaakita, Akita, Japan and is  west of Ōdate at  above sea level. It is also informally known as Akita North Airport (あきた北空港 Akita Kita Kūkō).

History
Efforts to build an airport in northern Akita Prefecture began in the late 1980s. The airport site was decided in April 1989, and construction began in 1994.

Odate–Noshiro Airport opened on 18 July 1998, with Air Nippon services to Tokyo Haneda Airport and Osaka Itami Airport, and seasonal service to Sapporo New Chitose Airport. Services to Sapporo were discontinued in November 1999, and services to Osaka were suspended from May 2010.  From January 2011, charter flight operations began to Taiwan's Taiwan Taoyuan International Airport.

The airport is located in northern Akita Prefecture, primarily serving the city of Noshiro and the surrounding region, which includes tourist destinations such as Shirakami-Sanchi, Lake Towada, and Towada-Hachimantai National Park. The airport terminal building makes extensive use of the local Akita cedar wood. However, the low local population density and competition from the Akita Shinkansen and its proximity to the international Aomori Airport have limited profitable airline operations.

Facilities 
The airport has a single, three-story terminal building with one boarding gate. The unsecured part of the terminal building also functions as a roadside station, a government-designated rest area along Akita Prefecture Route 324.

Airlines and destinations

Ground transportation 
Scheduled ground transportation is provided by Shuhoku Bus Group, which operates two daily "limousine bus" services to hotels in Odate City. Taxi and rental car service is also available.

References

External links 
 Odate-Noshiro Terminal Building

Airports in Japan
Transport in Akita Prefecture
Buildings and structures in Akita Prefecture
Airports established in 1998
1998 establishments in Japan
Kitaakita